Cosmopterix jiangxiella is a moth of the family Cosmopterigidae. It is found in Jiangxi, China.

The length of the forewings is about 4.7 mm.

References

jiangxiella